Riester is a surname. Notable people with the surname include:

 Franck Riester (born 1974), French politician
 Walter Riester (born 1943), German politician and former Minister of Labour and Social Affairs

See also
 Biester